Ambapur Nagla is an H chondrite meteorite that fell to earth on May 27, 1895, in Uttar Pradesh, India.

Classification
It is classified as H5-ordinary chondrite.

References

See also 
 Glossary of meteoritics
 Meteorite falls
 Ordinary chondrite

Meteorites found in India
Geology of Uttar Pradesh
1895 in British India